Plagiopyga is a genus of beetles in the family Carabidae, containing the following species:

 Plagiopyga camerunica Basilewsky, 1984 
 Plagiopyga chaudoiri Basilewsky, 1943 
 Plagiopyga cyclogona (Chaudoir, 1850) 
 Plagiopyga cymindoides Peringuey, 1896 
 Plagiopyga dolichocephala Basilewsky, 1954 
 Plagiopyga endroedyi Basilewsky, 1984 
 Plagiopyga ferruginea Boheman, 1848 
 Plagiopyga leleupi Basilewsky, 1950 
 Plagiopyga lissodera Basilewsky, 1954 
 Plagiopyga namaqua Basilewsky, 1984 
 Plagiopyga rufa (Gory, 1833) 
 Plagiopyga taterae Basilewsky, 1950 
 Plagiopyga transvaalensis Barker, 1919

References

Lebiinae